XEDF-FM/XEDF-AM (104.1 FM/1500 AM) is a radio station in Mexico City. It is the flagship of Grupo Fórmula's Segunda Cadena. 1500 AM is a United States clear-channel frequency.

XEDF-FM broadcasts in HD and carries four subchannels, including a one-hour timeshift feed of XEDF-FM, the 1500 AM feed, and Jazz FM jazz music.

History

AM
1500 AM began its life in the 1970s as XERH-AM "La Tropical Grande de México" with tropical music. In the 1980s, it became XEAI-AM (a callsign now on 1470) and adopted several formats, such as tropical music and general music. In 1998, the oldies Vida format at 1470 AM, then known as XESM, was moved to 1500.

It was not until 2000 that 1500 AM, rechristened XEDF-AM, became a news/talk station as part of Radio Fórmula's second national network.

FM
XEDF-FM came to air in 1984 as "Jazz FM", a station remembered as a milestone in the history of jazz in Mexico.

In 1992, XEDF became tropical-formatted Radio Uno, attempting to compete with XEQ-FM 92.9 "Tropi-Q" and XHFO-FM 92.1 "La Z". During this era Radio Uno was considered an important station in the promotion of new subgenres of cumbia as well as grupera music.

In 2000, XEDF-FM became the keystone of Radio Fórmula's Segunda Cadena (or Cadena Radio Uno, as it was known for a time), with yet more news and talk programming.

Programming
The Segunda Cadena complements the Primera Cadena with different personalities, such as Ciro Gómez Leyva, currently Imagen Televisión's lead news anchor, Denise Maerker, Ricardo Rocha, Jaime Núñez, Azucena Uresti and Leonardo Curzio, entertainment shows with Javier Poza and René Franco, tourism shows with José Antonio López Sosa, etc

References

1984 establishments in Mexico
News and talk radio stations in Mexico
Radio Fórmula
Radio stations established in 1984
Radio stations in Mexico City
Spanish-language radio stations